St. Lucy's Church or Church of St. Lucy may refer to:

Croatia
 Church of St. Lucy, Jurandvor, on the island of Krk in Croatia

Malta
 St Nicholas & St Lucy's Chapel, Buskett
 St Lucy's Chapel, Għaxaq
 Church of St Lucy, Valletta
 St Lucy's Church, Gozo

Sri Lanka
 St. Lucia's Cathedral, Colombo

United States
 St. Lucy's Church (Newark, New Jersey)
 St. Lucy's Church (Bronx, New York)
 St. Lucy's Church (Manhattan)
 Saint Lucy Parish, Campbell, California

See also
Saint Lucy
Santa Lucia (disambiguation)